The Lecithocerinae are a subfamily of small moths in the family Lecithoceridae. They are found worldwide, but most species occur in South Asia. The subfamily is characterized by the male genitalia with a bridge-like structure connecting the tegumen and the valva, and the uncus almost always is vestigial with two lobes at the dorsal base, only exceptionally united into a broad plate, but never as a thorn or spine.

Older classifications have treated the family Lecithoceridae as subfamily Lecithocerinae of Gelechiidae.

Taxonomy and systematics
Achoria Meyrick, 1904
Amaloxestis Gozmány, 1971
Atrichozancla Janse, 1954
Carodista Meyrick, 1925
Crinellus Park, 2012
Crocogma Meyrick, 1918
Dinochares Meyrick, 1925
Dolichotorna Meyrick, 1910
Doxogenes Meyrick, 1925
Dragmatucha Meyrick, 1908
Eridachtha Meyrick, 1910
Eurodachtha Gozmány in Amsel et al., 1978
Frisilia Walker, 1864
Hamatina Park, 2011
Heteralcis Meyrick, 1925
Heterodeltis Meyrick, 1925
Hoenea Gozmány, 1970
Homaloxestis Meyrick, 1910

Ilioparsis Gozmány, 1973
Issikiopteryx Moriuti, 1973
Kalocyrma Wu, 1994
Lacuniola Park, 2012
Lecithocera Herrich-Schäffer, 1853
Lecitholaxa Gozmány in Amsel et al., 1978
Mnesteria Meyrick, 1910
Neocorodes Meyrick, 1923
Neopectinimura Park in Park & Byun, 2010
Neotimyra Park, 2011
Nosphistica Meyrick, 1911
Onnuria Park, 2011
Oxygnostis Meyrick, 1925
Parelliptis Meyrick, 1910
Pectinimura Park in Park & Byun, 2008
Procharista Meyrick, 1922
Protolychnis Meyrick, 1925
Pseudocrates Meyrick, 1918
Rhizosthenes Meyrick in Caradja & Meyrick, 1935
Sarisophora Meyrick, 1904
Scolizona Park, 2011
Scythropiodes Matsumura, 1931
Siderostigma Gozmány, 1973
Spatulignatha Gozmány in Amsel et al., 1978
Strombiola Park, 2011
Synersaga Gozmány in Amsel et al., 1978
Sulciolus Park, 2012
Technographa Meyrick, 1925
Tegenocharis Gozmány, 1973
Telephata Meyrick, 1916
Teucrodoxa Meyrick, 1925
Thailepidonia Park, 2007
Timyra Walker, 1864
Tisis Walker, 1864
Trichoboscis Meyrick, 1929
Woonpaikia Park, 2010

References

 
Lecithoceridae
Moth subfamilies